New Gurgaon is a planned city situated in the state of Haryana in India. The two main clusters in New Gurgaon along the upcoming Dwarka-Gurgaon Expressway are Sectors 102 to 113 and Sectors 76 to 95 & 95A. New Gurgaon is well connected with three highways, NH48, Kundli–Manesar–Palwal Expressway and Dwarka-Gurgaon Expressway, Railway Station, Airport, and the proposed ISBT. Moreover, it is bisected by the National Highway Pataudi Road, which is the most promising upcoming real estate area of Gurgaon. According to the development plan for Gurgaon-Manesar Urban Complex-2025, the residential sectors of Gurgaon will ultimately reach Manesar.In the coming times New Gurgaon will attract more people,industries and businesses than old Gurgaon.

References 

Villages in Gurgaon district